HortPark is a  park and garden located in the southwestern part of Singapore. It opened in December 2007, but it was not until May 10, 2008, that Prime Minister Lee Hsien Loong, officially launched it.

Situated in the Southern Ridges, HortPark is a park connector that allows visitors to travel around Kent Ridge Park, Telok Blangah Hill Park, and Mount Faber Park. Traveling is made possible through elevated walkways and connecting bridges.

Features

HortPark comprises the following features:
HortCentre
Greenhouse Retail and Workshop
Hands-On House
HortLawn and Event Lawn
Theme Gardens
Butterfly Gardens

HortCentre
The two-storey HortCentre building also serves as the visitor services centre. It showcases gardening attractions, which include the Green Roof and the Lifestyle Corner. The building was one of the winners of 2008 International Architecture Award for Best New Global Design. It is also one of the 11 finalists for Urban Land Institute's (ULI) Awards for Excellence 2009.

Green Roof is a rooftop display of the different types of green roof systems and plants suitable for green roof planting. Lifestyle Corner is where visitors can see how flora-themed furnishings can complement the homes, through the showcasing of interior landscaping and lifestyle-gardening ideas.

Greenhouse Garden Retail and Workshop
Located near the visitor services centre, the greenhouse consists of two-halves: garden retail and workshop area. The garden retail is currently managed by The Plant Story which also operates a café on the premises. Meanwhile, the workshop area is used to conduct workshops organised by HortPark.

Hands-On House
The Hands-On House is a laboratory in a classroom setting. It also consists of a sheltered demonstration area in an outdoor setting for learning purposes. It is also popular with small groups of fitness and wellness enthusiasts.

HortLawn and Event Lawn
HortLawn is located near to the HortCentre while Event Lawn can be found near the Hands-On House. Both lawns are suitable for hosting a wide variety of outdoor activities such as workshops, bazaars and functions.

Butterfly Garden
The Butterfly Garden was opened in May 2009 by the National Parks Board in partnership with National Biodiversity Centre to allow visitors to learn about the different stages of butterfly metamorphosis and also serve as an experimental garden to facilitate butterfly species recovery.

The  landscaped theme garden allows visitors to encounter the butterflies up close and personal amongst a visual feast of tropical plants and nearly 20 species of native butterflies. The research focus of the Butterfly Species Recovery Programme is to find suitable nectar and host plants for breeding a variety of butterfly species, including locally extinct species such as clipper (Parthenos sylvia) and common sergeant (Athyma perius).

Theme gardens

HortPark features 21 theme gardens. Each theme is reflected by the careful selection of plant species.
Floral Walk
Home Garden
Car Park Garden
Lifestyle Corner
Water Garden
Vertical Greenery
Silver Garden
Balinese Garden
Plant Introduction Garden
Native Garden
Pitter Patter Potter Garden
Butterfly Garden
Herb and Spice Garden
Fruit Garden
Vegetable Garden
Golden Garden

GardenTech
HortPark played host to GardenTech 2007 and GardenTech 2009, a biennial gardening carnival that showcases the latest horticulture and landscaping technology tools, products and services. Both local and overseas exhibitors alike participated in the carnival.

Other involvement
HortPark also features a series of other initiatives by the National Parks Board (NParks). They include Community in Bloom (CIB), which encourages communal gardening and "The Living Wall", a research project by Building and Construction Authority (BCA), National University of Singapore and NParks. "The Living Wall" showcases vertical greenery systems. HortPark also features six prototype glasshouses as research stations for the upcoming Gardens by the Bay. In addition, HortPark serves as a satellite campus for the Centre of Urban Greenery and Ecology (CUGE) which is managed by the Industry Development arm under NParks.

See also
List of parks in Singapore

References

External links

National Parks Board
HortPark

Parks in Singapore
Tourist attractions in Singapore